Jacques-Nicolas (Jaak-Nicolaas) Lemmens (3 January 1823 – 30 January 1881), was an organist, music teacher, and composer for his instrument.

Biography
Born at Zoerle-Parwijs, near Westerlo, Belgium, Lemmens took lessons from François-Joseph Fétis, who wanted to make him into a musician capable of renewing the organ-player's art in Belgium. Fétis sent him to Adolf Friedrich Hesse in Germany to learn Johann Sebastian Bach's tradition.

In 1847, Lemmens won the Paris Conservatoire's prestigious Prix de Rome with his Le roi Lear ("King Lear"). One year later he published his first work for organ: Dix improvisations dans le style sévère et chantant ("Ten improvisations in a strict and singing style"). In March 1849 he was appointed organ teacher at the Royal Brussels Conservatoire, aged only 26; and he trained numerous young musicians, including two eminent Frenchmen, Alexandre Guilmant and Charles-Marie Widor. 

During 1852 he gave organ recitals in Saint Vincent de Paul, La Madeleine and Saint Eustache churches in Paris, where he stunned audiences with his technique. Particularly notable was his brilliant pedal-playing, which owed a good deal to his studies of Bach's music (at the time Bach's organ works were not at all well known in France). In 1857 he married the English soprano Helen Sherrington (1834–1906), who in the following decade emerged as a leading English concert and operatic singer.  He died at Zemst, near Mechelen, Belgium.

Compositions for organ
 Dix Improvisations dans le style sévère et chantant (1848)
 École d'Orgue, basée sur le plain-chant romain (Orgelschule, 1862), incl.:
 Prélude à 5  (Grave) in E-flat major
 Prière (Moderato cantabile) in E major 
 Fanfare (Allegro non troppo) in D major
 Cantabile (Allegretto) in B minor
 Final (Allegro) in D major
 Four organ pieces in free style : Allegretto in B flat, Christmas-Offertorium, Fantasia in A minor, Grand Fantasia (The Storm) in E minor (1866)
 Trois Sonatas (1874):
 Sonate Nr. 1 "Pontificale" in D minor 
1. Allegro moderato
2. Adagio
3. Marche Pontificale (Maestoso)
4. Fuga (Fanfare)
 Sonate Nr. 2 "O Filii" in E minor 
1. Prélude (Allegro non troppo)
2. Cantabile (Andante)
3. Fuga (Allegro con fuoco)
 Sonate Nr. 3 "Pascale" in A minor 
1. Allegro
2. Adoration (Andante sostenuto)
3. Finale "Alleluia" (Maestoso recitando - Allegro)

Lemmensinstituut
At the request of the Belgian clerical authorities, Lemmens returned to Belgium  to found a school for Church music in Mechelen in 1879. This was to become the future Lemmensinstituut after its move to Leuven in 1968. Lemmens could only work at the development of this school for two years, as he died on 30 January 1881. He was succeeded by Edgar Tinel.

References
 Lowell Lacey, '"Jaak-Nicolaas Lemmens" (1823-1881) in Adem. 1979.
 François Sabatier, Lemmens, Jacques-Nicolas at Grove Music Online.
 Annelies Focquaert, Lemmens, Jacques-Nicolas at SVM.

External links
 

1823 births
1881 deaths
Belgian classical organists
Male classical organists
Belgian classical composers
Belgian male classical composers
Romantic composers
Academic staff of the Royal Conservatory of Brussels
Prix de Rome (Belgium) winners
19th-century classical composers
People from Westerlo
19th-century Belgian male musicians
19th-century organists